Sabicea amomii is a species of woodvine in the family Rubiaceae, which is native to Cameroon. There are no synonyms.

Description
Wernham describes the vine as being close to S. venosa, but differing in its leaf-venation, its inflorescence and its longer calyx lobes. It has leaves which are about 8 cm by 4 cm, on stalks from 1 cm to more than 3 cm long. The stipules are about 5 mm long and 4 mm wide at the base. The peduncles are about 6 mm and the bracts 5 mm by 1.2 mm, with flowers on pedicels nearly 3 mm long. The calyx lobes are up to 5 mm long, and the ovary is slightly greater than 1 mm in depth. The corolla is about 1 cm long.

The type specimen, BM000820046 (collected by George Latimer Bates at Bitye in the Yaoundé district), is annotated as having been found climbing in Amomum-thicket by a stream within a forest (thereby giving rise to the species epithet, amomii) and having a dark-greenish-purple corolla.

References

External links
Sabicea amomii images and occurrence data from GBIF

amomii
Plants described in 1919
Taxa named by Herbert Fuller Wernham